The 1978 North Dakota State Bison football team was an American football team that represented North Dakota State University during the 1978 NCAA Division II football season as a member of the North Central Conference. In their third year under head coach Jim Wacker, the team compiled a 6–4 record.

Schedule

References

North Dakota State
North Dakota State Bison football seasons
North Dakota State Bison football